Sinitus AG is a financial services company based in Zurich, Switzerland.

Sinitus’ core business areas are Fiduciary and Trust, Family Office, Asset Management, Tax Planning, Accounting, Art Advisory, Real Estate Advisory, Legal Advice and Inheritance Advisory.

Sinitus was formed in 1992, when the Zurich office of Rothschild Bank AG outsourced its fiduciary department.
Since its inception, Sinitus has remained a joint stock company.

The senior partner of Sinitus is Mr Urs Meisterhans.

The company is an accredited member of the Union of Swiss Fiduciaries, a professional association of the Fiduciaries of Switzerland. 
Sinitus’ business operations are based in Küsnacht on the shores of the Lake Zurich.

Sinitus was liquidated at the order of the Swiss Financial Markets Authority (FINMA) because of its non-compliance with Swiss rules and regulations.

References

Financial services companies of Switzerland